Lewis Arnold may refer to:

 Lewis Golding Arnold (1817–1871), U.S. Army officer
 Lewis Arnold (director), English director